Cheravirus is a genus of viruses in the order Picornavirales, in the family Secoviridae. Plants serve as natural hosts. There are five species in this genus.

The name is derived from Cherry rasp leaf virus.

Taxonomy
The genus contains the following species:
Apple latent spherical virus
Arracacha virus B
Cherry rasp leaf virus
Currant latent virus
Stocky prune virus

Structure
Viruses in Cheravirus are non-enveloped, with icosahedral geometries, and T=pseudo3 symmetry. The diameter is around 25-30 nm. Genomes are linear and bipartite, around 13.3kb in length.

Life cycle
Viral replication is cytoplasmic, and is lysogenic. Entry into the host cell is achieved by penetration into the host cell. Replication follows the positive stranded RNA virus replication model. Positive stranded RNA virus transcription is the method of transcription. The virus exits the host cell by tubule-guided viral movement.
Plants serve as the natural host. The virus is transmitted via a vector (nematodes maybe seed-transmitted). Transmission routes are vector and seed borne.

References

External links
 Viralzone: Cheravirus
 ICTV
UniProt Taxonomy 

Secoviridae
Viral plant pathogens and diseases
Virus genera